Amaurotic nystagmus is defined as the nystagmus associated with blindness or the central vision defects. It is characterized by the pendular or jerky movements of the eyes in the patients who have visual impairment for a long period of time.

References

External links 

Eye diseases